The 1988–89 Virginia Cavaliers men's basketball team represented University of Virginia as a member of the Atlantic Coast Conference during the 1988–89 NCAA Division I men's basketball season. The team was led by 15th-year head coach Terry Holland. The Cavaliers earned an at-large bid to the NCAA tournament as #5 seed in the Southeast region, and made a run to the Elite Eight before falling to Michigan, the eventual national champion.

Roster

Schedule and results

|-
!colspan=9 style="background:#00214e; color:#f56d22;"| Regular season

|-
!colspan=9 style="background:#00214e; color:#f56d22;"| ACC Tournament

|-
!colspan=9 style="background:#00214e; color:#f56d22;"| NCAA tournament

References

Virginia Cavaliers men's basketball seasons
Virginia
Virginia
Virgin
Virgin